VTM 3 is a Flemish television station. The station got its license for 9 years in 1999 and it started to broadcast on 25 August 2000.
VTM3 can be seen on Flemish cable and satellite services. The station is part of DPG Media (formerly Medialaan, VMMa, and VTM)

VTM 3 was launched as Vitaya and began as a niche station with seven blocks of programming:
 Eet-Wijzer
 Gemengde Gevoelens
 Spiegelbeeld
 Vrije Tijd
 Wonen
 Kinderen
 Vitali-Tijd

In 2003, the station expanded the broadcast time in favor of more local productions, daily newscasts, a cooking show, and a fitness show.

Vitaya profiled itself as a lifestyle station and is oriented at the following subjects: happiness, health, good food, the family, gardening and interior design, fashion, leisure and travel, lifestyle, and human interest.

Because of the launch of the SBS station Vijf with a similar profile, Vitaya received some competition. Vitaya started to show more foreign productions and produced more own programs and thereby drastically expanded the broadcasting time. In that way, the station was able to keep on growing and end 2005 in the green.

On 31 August 2020, Vitaya rebranded as VTM 3, as part of a rebranding of the 4 main DPG channels. VTM 3 proposes 1 movie per day.

Programming

Currently aired Imported productions
Anger Management
Better Things
Chicago Med
Containment
How I Met Your Mother
Mayans M.C.
Modern Family
Orange Is the New Black
Perfect Harmony
Queen of the South
Sturm der Liebe
S.W.A.T.
The Simpsons
This Is Us
Timeless
Vikings
Will & Grace

Formerly aired Imported productions
999: What's Your Emergency?
All Saints
Ambulance
Australian Princess
Choccywoccydoodah
Coronation Street
Dawson's Creek
Dinner Date
Don't Tell the Bride
Embarrassing Bodies
From the Ground Up with Debbie Travis
Gold Coast Medical
Harry's Practice
Home and Away
House Rules
How to Look Good Naked
Keeping Up with the Kardashians
Kitchen Nightmares
Ladette to Lady
Love It or List It
Love It or List It Australia
Love Your Garden
MasterChef Australia
Million Dollar Matchmaker
Offspring
One Born Every Minute
A Place in the Sun
Project Runway
Rosemary & Thyme
Sangre de mi tierra
Secret Diary of a Call Girl
The Dr. Oz Show
The Hotel Inspector
The Real Housewives
The Real Housewives of New York City
The Martha Stewart Show
The Resident
Trinny & Susannah Undress...
WAGS
William and Mary
You Rang, M'Lord?

References

Television channels in Flanders
Television channels in Belgium
Television channels and stations established in 2000
Vilvoorde
2000 establishments in Belgium